The 2009 ACC Twenty20 Cup was played between 22 and 30 November 2009 in the United Arab Emirates.

The twelve competing teams were: Afghanistan, Bahrain, China, Hong Kong, Kuwait, Malaysia, Nepal, Oman, Qatar, Saudi Arabia, Singapore and the UAE.

Afghanistan defeated the United Arab Emirates in the final to win the tournament for the second time, following their joint victory with Oman in 2007. In the third place playoff Oman defeated Kuwait, meaning they will join Afghanistan and the United Arab Emirates for the cricket tournament at the 2010 Asian Games, along with the national teams of Bangladesh, China, India, Pakistan and Sri Lanka.

Group stage

Group A

Results

Group B

Results

Semi-finals and Playoffs

11th/12th place playoff

9th/10th place playoff

7th/8th place playoff

5th/6th place playoff

Semi-finals

3rd place playoff and Final

3rd/4th place playoff

Final

Final standings

Statistics

See also
ACC Trophy

References

External links

International cricket in 2009-10
 Fixtures

ACC Twenty20 Cup
Cricket in the United Arab Emirates
ACC Twenty20 Cup
ACC